Martia may refer to:

 Martia L. Davis Berry (1844-1894), social reformer
 Martia arizonella, of the genus Martia, a monotypic moth genus
 Oxyepoecus, an ant genus, one of whose former names was Martia
 Legio IV Martia, a legion of the Roman Empire
 Martia, a character in the 1991 film Star Trek VI: The Undiscovered Country

See also 
 Martian (disambiguation)
 Marcia (disambiguation)
 Martial (disambiguation)
 Rony Martias (born 1980) French cyclist